Vincent Brown is Charles Warren Professor of History, Professor of African and African-American Studies, and Director of the History Design Studio at Harvard University. His research, writing, teaching, and other creative endeavors are focused on the political dimensions of cultural practice in the African Diaspora, with a particular emphasis on the early modern Atlantic world.

Life

A native of Southern California, Vincent Brown was educated at the University of California, San Diego, and received his PhD in History from Duke University, where he also trained in the theory and craft of film and video making. He is the author of numerous articles and reviews in scholarly journals, he is Principal Investigator and Curator for the animated thematic map Slave Revolt in Jamaica, 1760–1761: A Cartographic Narrative (2013), and he was Producer and Director of Research for the television documentary Herskovits at the Heart of Blackness (2009), recipient of the 2009 John E. O'Connor Film Award of the American Historical Association, awarded Best Documentary at both the 2009 Hollywood Black Film Festival and the 2009 Martha's Vineyard African-American Film Festival, and broadcast nationally on season 11 of the PBS series Independent Lens. His first book, The Reaper's Garden: Death and Power in the World of Atlantic Slavery (2008), was co-winner of the 2009 Merle Curti Award and received the 2009 James A. Rawley Prize and the 2008–09 Louis Gottschalk Prize.  Dr. Brown can be seen in the 2013 PBS documentary series The African Americans: Many Rivers to Cross.

Awards
2021: Frederick Douglass Prize for Tacky's Revolt
2021: James A. Rawley Prize (OAH) for Tacky's Revolt
2021: Anisfield-Wolf Book Award for non-fiction for Tacky's Revolt
2020: Cundill Prize finalist for Tacky's Revolt
2011: Guggenheim Fellowship
2009: Merle Curti Award for The Reaper's Garden: Death and Power in the World of Atlantic Slavery
2009: James A. Rawley Prize (OAH) for The Reaper’s Garden: Death and Power in the World of Atlantic Slavery
2008–09: Gottschalk Prize for The Reaper’s Garden: Death and Power in the World of Atlantic Slavery

Works

"Blackness in Diaspora," in Plantation Society in the Americas Vol. VI, Nos 2&3 (Fall 1999): 305–12 (1999)

References

1967 births
Living people
21st-century American historians
21st-century American male writers
University of California, San Diego alumni
Duke University alumni
Harvard University faculty
American male non-fiction writers